Uzmino is a village in Strugo-Krasnensky District of Pskov Oblast, Russia

Rural localities in Pskov Oblast
Gdovsky Uyezd